Sestra ("Sister") may refer to:

Rivers in Russia
Sestra (Leningrad Oblast), a tributary of the Gulf of Finland in Leningrad Oblast
Sestra (Moscow Oblast), a tributary of the Dubna in the Moscow and Tver Oblasts

Other
Sestra (moth), a genus of moths in the family Geometridae